Alan Kenneth Winstanley (born 2 November 1952) is an English record producer and songwriter, active from the mid-1970s onwards. He usually works with Clive Langer.

His early career during the mid-1970s was as an audio engineer, working on albums by The Stranglers in addition to releases by Joe Jackson and Generation X. He also worked with songwriter Brian Wade producing teen pop singer Nikki Richards' single "Oh Boy!" in 1978.

Notable studio albums produced or co-produced by Winstanley
 Generation X (1978) (Winstanley engineered).
 One Step Beyond... – Madness (1979)
 The Raven – The Stranglers (1979)
 4 Out of 5 Doctors – 4 Out of 5 Doctors (1980)
 Absolutely – Madness (1980)
 Kilimanjaro – The Teardrop Explodes (1980)
 7 – Madness (1981)
 Eddie, Old Bob, Dick and Gary - Tenpole Tudor (1981)
 Too-Rye-Ay – Dexys Midnight Runners (1982)
 The Rise & Fall – Madness (1982)
 Punch the Clock – Elvis Costello and the Attractions (1983)
 Goodbye Cruel World – Elvis Costello and the Attractions (1984)
 Despite Straight Lines – Marilyn (1985)
 People – Hothouse Flowers (1988)
 Flood – They Might Be Giants (1990)
 Home – Hothouse Flowers (1990)
 Kill Uncle – Morrissey (1991)
 Sixteen Stone – Bush (1994)
 One Day at a Time – Symposium (1997)
 The Science of Things – Bush (1999)
 Lifelines – a-ha (2002)
 Please Describe Yourself – Dogs Die in Hot Cars (2004)
 Despite Straight Lines: The Very Best of Marilyn – Marilyn (2008)
 The Liberty of Norton Folgate – Madness (2009)
 The Borderland'' – Hardwicke Circus (2021)

References

External links
Official website

1952 births
Living people
English audio engineers
English record producers
English songwriters
People from Fulham
The Stranglers